Franny Billingsley (born July 3, 1954) is the author of three children's fantasy novels, Well Wished, The Folk Keeper, and Chime, and the picture book Big Bad Bunny.

Biography

Billingsley graduated from Tufts University in 1976, and from Boston University Law School in 1979. After moving back to Chicago, she wrote for many years while working at 57th Street Books in Hyde Park. She is now a full-time author. She has two children.

Billingsley received the PEN/Phyllis Naylor Working Writer Fellowship in 2003, which is awarded to an author of children's or young-adult fiction of literary merit to complete a manuscript.

Works 
Well Wished (1997) 
The Folk Keeper (1999) 
Big Bad Bunny (2008) 
Chime (2011) 
The Robber Girl (2021)

Awards
1998 Anne Spencer Lindbergh Prize Honor Book for best fantasy written in the English language (Well Wished)
2000 Boston Globe-Horn Book Award, Fiction (The Folk Keeper)
2000 Mythopoeic Fantasy Award, Children's Literature (The Folk Keeper)
2011 National Book Award for Young People's Literature finalist (Chime)

References

External links
 
Franny Billingsley papers at the University of Minnesota
 
 

1954 births
20th-century American novelists
21st-century American novelists
American children's writers
Living people
Place of birth missing (living people)
American women novelists
20th-century American women writers
21st-century American women writers